Erik Knudsen (1235-1303) was a Danish duke and Drost, the son of Canute, Duke of Estonia and Hedvig Svantepolkdotter and therefore a grandson of Valdemar II of Denmark.In 1277 he was mentioned as a Junker. In 1279 he lived in Zealand on his farm of Skarsholm and was the chairman of the county council. In 1283 he was appointed as the Drost of Denmark. In 1284 he was made the Duke of Southern Halland. He was also the lord of Skarsholm. In 1285 he was knighted by the king of Sweden. He is buried in Ringsted.

References 

13th-century Danish nobility
Dukes of Denmark
1235 births
1303 deaths